Terry H. McMillan is an American politician and surgeon who served as a member of the New Mexico House of Representatives for the 37th district from 2011 to 2017.

Education
McMillan earned his MD at the University of Texas Medical Branch.

Elections
2012 McMillan was unopposed for the June 5, 2012 Republican Primary after a challenger refiled to run for the open New Mexico Senate seat; McMillan won with 1,007 votes and won the November 6, 2012 General election by 8 votes with 6,267 votes (50.03%) against Democratic nominee Joanne Ferrary.
2010 To challenge District 37 incumbent Democratic Representative Jeff Steinborn, McMillan ran in the June 1, 2010 Republican Primary and won with 1,756 votes (81.1%) and won the November 2, 2010 General election with 6,110 votes (51.4%) against Representative Steinborn.

References

External links
Official page at the New Mexico Legislature
Terry McMillan at Ballotpedia
Terry H. McMillan at OpenSecrets (result in 2012 shown incorrect)

Place of birth missing (living people)
Year of birth missing (living people)
Living people
Republican Party members of the New Mexico House of Representatives
Politicians from Las Cruces, New Mexico
University of Texas Medical Branch alumni
21st-century American politicians
Physicians from New Mexico